Epiphany Apostolic College, formerly known as the Josephite Collegiate Seminary, was a Catholic minor seminary founded in Baltimore, Maryland in 1889 by John R. Slattery for the Mill Hill Missionaries, a UK-based society of apostolic life. 

A few years later, the seminary came under the service of the Society of St. Joseph of the Sacred Heart (the Josephites), an American offshoot of the Mill Hill Missionaries that serves African Americans.

Two of the co-founders of the Josephites served as rectors of the seminary in its early history, Dominic Manley and Charles Uncles, the first African-American Catholic priest trained and ordained in the United States. For several decades in the early to late 20th century, racial politics led to the seminary being closed to most African Americans. 

The seminary later moved to New Windsor, New York in 1925, and was merged into the former Our Lady of Hope Seminary in 1970. The college building later became Epiphany Apostolic High School, which closed its doors in 1975. It is now the site of a public middle school.

Notable alumni 

 Antoine Garibaldi
 Archbishop Eugene A. Marino
 Bishop John H. Ricard
 Bishop Carl A. Fisher
 Bishop Joseph L. Howze
 Marlon Green
 Edward Francis Murphy

See also 

 St. Joseph's Seminary (Washington, DC)
 Black Catholicism

References 
Educational institutions established in 1889
Society of St. Joseph of the Sacred Heart
Baltimore County, Maryland
New Windsor, New York
African-American Roman Catholicism
Catholic seminaries in the United States
Catholic priesthood
Religious organizations established in 1889
Catholic educational institutions
Epiphany Apostolic College